Las Garzas is a village located in Marchigue, Cardenal Caro Province, Chile, near Pichilemu. It was formerly a farm.

References

External links

Populated places in Cardenal Caro Province